Heng Fa Chuen is one of the 35 constituencies in the Eastern District.

The constituency returns one district councillor to the Eastern District Council, with an election every four years. The seat is currently held by Wong Kwok-hing of the Hong Kong Federation of Trade Unions.

Heng Fa Chuen constituency is loosely based on Heng Fa Chuen with estimated population of 18,597.

Councillors represented

Election results

2010s

2000s

1990s

Notes

References

Heng Fa Chuen
Constituencies of Hong Kong
Constituencies of Eastern District Council
1991 establishments in Hong Kong
Constituencies established in 1991